The Oahe Dam is a large earthen dam on the Missouri River, just north of Pierre, South Dakota, United States. The dam creates Lake Oahe, the fourth-largest man-made reservoir in the United States. The reservoir stretches  up the course of the Missouri to Bismarck, North Dakota. The dam's power plant provides electricity for much of the north-central United States. It is named for the Oahe Indian Mission established among the Lakota Sioux in 1874.

The project provides flood control, hydropower generation, irrigation, and navigation benefits. Oahe Dam is one of six Missouri River mainstem dams, the next dam upstream is Garrison Dam, near Riverdale, North Dakota, and the next dam downstream is Big Bend Dam, near Fort Thompson, South Dakota.

South Dakota Highway 204 runs directly atop the Oahe Dam, providing an automobile crossing of the Missouri river at the dam.

History

In September and October 1804, the Lewis and Clark Expedition passed through what is now Lake Oahe while exploring the Missouri River.

The Oahe Dam was authorized by the Flood Control Act of 1944, and construction by the United States Army Corps of Engineers began in 1948. The world's first rock tunnel boring machine (TBM) was invented in 1952 by James S. Robbins for the Oahe Dam project, which marked the beginning of machines replacing human tunnelers. The earth main dam reached its full height in October 1959. It was officially dedicated by President John F. Kennedy on August 17, 1962, the year in which it began generating power. The original project cost was $340,000,000.

Statistics

 Dam height: 
 Dam volume of earth fill: 92,000,000 cubic yards (70,000,000 m³)
 Dam volume of concrete: 1,122,000 cubic yards (858,000 m³)
 Spillway width: 
 Spillway crest elevation: 
 Lake maximum depth: 
 Plant discharge 
 Water speed through intake tunnels: 11 mph (5 m/s)
 Intake tunnel length: 3,650 feet (average) (1110 m)
 Number of turbines: 7, Francis type, 100 RPM
 Power generated per turbine: 112.29 MW
 reservoir storage capacity: .
 States served with electricity: North Dakota, South Dakota, Nebraska, Minnesota and Montana
 Number of recreation areas around lake: 51
 Shore length: 
 Counties bordering lake: 14, including 4 in North Dakota (Burleigh, Emmons, Morton, Sioux), and 10 in South Dakota (Campbell, Corson, Dewey, Haakon, Hughes, Potter, Stanley, Sully, Walworth, and Ziebach)

Tours
Tours of the powerplant are given daily, Memorial Day through Labor Day.

Native American displacement

As a result of the dam's construction the Cheyenne River Indian Reservation lost  bringing it down to  today. Much of the land was taken by eminent domain claims made by the Bureau of Reclamation. Over and above the land loss, most of the reservations' prime agricultural land was included in the loss. The regions where the populations were resettled had soil with a higher clay content, and resources such as medicinal plants were less prevalent.

The loss of this land had a dramatic effect on the Natives who lived on the reservations. Most of the land was unable to be harvested (to allow the trees to be cut down for wood, etc.) before the land was flooded over with water.  One visitor to the reservations later asked why there were so few older Natives on the reservations and was told that "the old people had died of heartache" after the construction of the dam and the loss of the reservations' land. As of 2015, poverty remains a problem for the displaced populations in the Dakotas, who are still seeking compensation for the loss of the towns submerged under Lake Oahe, and the loss of their traditional ways of life.

Huff Archeological Site is a fortified Mandan village site on what is now the bank of Lake Oahe. It is designated a National Historic Landmark, but is endangered by erosion pressure from the lake.

2011 flooding

Excessive precipitation in the spring, along with melting snow from the Rocky Mountains forced the dam to open the release gates (not the spillway), releasing  in June with another  through the power plant totaling .

See also

 Keystone Pipeline
 List of reservoirs and dams in the United States

Notes

References
 Lawson, Michael L. Dammed Indians: the Pick-Sloan Plan and the Missouri River Sioux, 1944–1980. Norman: University of Oklahoma Press, 1982. 
 Lazarus, Edward. Black Hills, White Justice: The Sioux Nation Versus the United States, 1775 to the Present. New York: Harper Collins, 1991. .
 Cornell University site
 U.S. Army Corps of Engineers pamphlet "Oahe Power Plant", no date
 Summary of Engineering Data – Missouri River Main Stem System  http://www.nwd-mr.usace.army.mil/rcc/projdata/summaryengdat.pdf

External links
 U.S. Army Corps of Engineers - Oahe Project
 Daily Reservoir Water Levels and Water Releases Information (U.S. Army Corps of Engineers)

Buildings and structures in Hughes County, South Dakota
Buildings and structures in Stanley County, South Dakota
Dams completed in 1962
Dams in South Dakota
Dams on the Missouri River
Earth-filled dams
Energy infrastructure completed in 1962
Hydroelectric power plants in South Dakota
United States Army Corps of Engineers dams

de:Lake Oahe